The sixth series of On the Buses originally aired between 20 February 1972 and 2 April 1972, beginning with "No Smoke Without Fire". The series was produced and directed by Derrick Goodwin for episodes one, four and six and Bryan Izzard for the other episodes. The series designer was Alan Hunter-Craig. Episodes one, three, four and five were written by Bob Grant and Stephen Lewis. Episodes two, six and seven were written by George Layton and Jonathan Lynn.

Cast
 Reg Varney as Stan Butler
 Bob Grant as Jack Harper
 Anna Karen as Olive Rudge
 Doris Hare as Mabel "Mum" Butler
 Stephen Lewis as Inspector Cyril "Blakey" Blake
 Michael Robbins as Arthur Rudge
 Maurice Bush as Basher

Episodes

{|class="wikitable plainrowheaders" style="width:100%; margin:auto;"
|-
! scope="col" style="background:#97A179;color:black;" | Episode No.
! scope="col" style="background:#97A179;color:black;" | Series No.
! scope="col" style="background:#97A179;color:black;" | Title
! scope="col" style="background:#97A179;color:black;" | Written by
! scope="col" style="background:#97A179;color:black;" | Original air date

|}

See also
 1972 in British television

References

External links
Series 6 at the Internet Movie Database

On the Buses
1972 British television seasons